Randhurst Village, previously known as Randhurst Mall and Randhurst Center or simply Randhurst, is a shopping mall located at the corner of Rand Road (U.S. Route 12) and Elmhurst Road (Illinois Route 83) in Mount Prospect, Illinois. The mall took its name from combining the names of these two roads.

The original owner of the mall was the Randhurst Corporation (a joint venture of Carson Pirie Scott, Wieboldt's, and Montgomery Ward). At the time of its 1962 opening, it was the first enclosed regional mall in the Chicago area and the largest enclosed air-conditioned space in the United States. In 2009, the mall was demolished and rebuilt as Randhurst Village.

Currently owned by DLC Management, this open-air mixed-use center features national and regional retailers, several restaurants, second-floor offices, a 140-room hotel and a 12-screen cinema. It is now anchored by AMC Theatres, Costco Wholesale and Hampton by Hilton. Other stores include Home Depot, Jewel-Osco, PetSmart, and TJ Maxx among others.

History

Origins
Randhurst was born out of a desire by Carson Pirie Scott to expand its business into Chicago's northwest suburbs, an untapped market at the time.  Spurred by Marshall Field's expansion into Skokie at the new Old Orchard Shopping Center in 1958, Carson Pirie Scott secured an  lot in Mount Prospect for purposes of building a shopping mall.  Studies showed the mall would have a service area of 300,000, with another 100,000 expected by 1965.  By 1959, the department stores Wieboldt's and Montgomery Ward had created a joint venture with Carson Pirie Scott, named the Randhurst Corporation. Instead of using the Montgomery Ward nameplate, however, Montgomery Ward would use the nameplate of its subsidiary brand, The Fair Department Store (a.k.a. "the Fair"), on its anchor store.

Randhurst was designed by Victor Gruen, a pioneer of modern shopping mall design. Unlike most shopping malls of the time, which were built in a straight line between two anchoring department stores, Gruen's design was shaped like an equilateral triangle, with an anchoring department store at each angle.  Additional stores lined the sides of the triangle on two levels: a conventional level (termed the "mezzanine" level), continuous with the first floors of the anchor stores, and a level located half a floor below the first level (termed the "bazaar" level), located down a flight of stairs facing the first level. A floor of offices occupied the level above this "subfloor" of stores.  A ring of clerestory windows was mounted in a domed area over the center of the mall; mounted just inside these windows were numerous stained glass windows in various oval and round shapes, oriented in such a way as to cast beams of colored light into the mall itself. As the mall was built at the height of the Cold War, it included a fallout shelter big enough to hold every citizen of Mount Prospect.

Thus, at the time of its 1962 opening, the  Randhurst had three major department store anchors: Wieboldt's, Carson Pirie Scott, and The Fair.  All three anchors had two above-ground floors and a full basement.  Of the three anchors, the Carson Pirie Scott anchor was the most distinctive, featuring turquoise-colored accents at the entrances and multi-colored lights around its perimeter.  Other stores included Baskins, Charles A. Stevens, Jewel Food Stores, S.S. Kresge, and Woolworth's. In 1963, the Randhurst Fair store would be the first Fair store to be renamed as a Montgomery Ward store; Montgomery Ward also built an auto service center at the perimeter of the mall.  Randhurst would retain this configuration well into the 1980s.

1980s
In 1981, The Rouse Company acquired Randhurst from the Randhurst Corporation.  In 1985, Rouse converted the upper sub-level of offices into a food court–one of the first in the Chicago area–and more retail space; a complete conventional second floor of retail space would be constructed by 1990. The "subfloor" of stores was also made larger and easier to access.  In 1987, the entire Wieboldt's chain went bankrupt and closed its stores; Peoria, Illinois-based Bergner's acquired the empty Randhurst location. Shortly thereafter, Elgin-based specialty department store Joseph Spiess Company built a minor anchor, next to the Wieboldt's/Bergner's anchor, and MainStreet added another minor anchor near the Montgomery Ward anchor (just before the chain was acquired by Kohl's). Spiess expanded too rapidly and too late for the market; as a consequence of this, the chain went bankrupt, and the store at Randhurst closed on January 31, 1992.

1990s
In 1990, Bergner's–which had acquired Carson Pirie Scott in 1989–closed its Randhurst store, allowing the Carson Pirie Scott anchor to move into the grander ex-Wieboldt's building while JCPenney took over the former Carson Pirie Scott anchor. Wickes Furniture briefly occupied the Spiess anchor, until Circuit City and Old Navy took over the space in 1995; meanwhile, a new Filene's Basement minor anchor occupied the majority of the "bazaar" level.

The next ten years, however, would be much more difficult for Randhurst.  The construction and expansion of multiple shopping malls in the area, especially the improvements to Woodfield Mall (which included The Streets of Woodfield) in nearby Schaumburg, devastated Randhurst's shopping base, as did the local population's general change in shopping tastes. In 1996, the mall's management tried to compensate by updating the mall's decor and adding new Jewel-Osco and Home Depot stores at the perimeter of the mall (the Home Depot replacing the closed Child World building, formerly the Randhurst Ice Arena, and Wards Auto Center); despite this, foot traffic fell, and stores began disappearing from the mall at a rapid rate.  This included the Filene's Basement minor anchor, which closed in 1999 (along with three other Chicago-area Filene's Basement stores). In June 1999, a Borders book store was added (it would close in April 2011).

2000s
The problems for Randhurst continued as one of Chicago's first lifestyle centers, Deer Park Town Center, opened in north suburban Deer Park in 2000. This open-air shopping center became increasingly popular and may have attracted patrons who would have otherwise traveled to Randhurst or nearby Woodfield Mall. Meanwhile, Randhurst suffered the loss of its JCPenney and Montgomery Ward anchors within months of each other in 2001. JCPenney had labeled the Randhurst store as an "underperformer," and therefore closed the location as they did many other "underperforming" locations. The Montgomery Ward anchor was remodeled and rebranded as Wards in 2000 as part of a chain-wide "last-ditch" effort to revive the brand; when this failed, Wards closed its entire chain of stores and went out of business. In 2003, Kohl's moved its store to a space formerly occupied by Venture/Big Kmart near the corner of Elmhurst Road and Dempster Street on the south end of Mount Prospect. Following the sudden departure of these three anchor tenants, many stores inside the mall closed as well. The devastating loss of numerous tenants and anchors led many to believe that Randhurst was about to become a dead mall.

In 2004, some revitalization did occur for the mall, as a grand remodeling and repositioning scheme for the mall was put in motion.  The former JCPenney and Kohl's anchors were demolished to build a new  Costco anchor with no entry to the mall proper.  Similarly, the former Montgomery Ward anchor was mostly torn down to create a grand new "promenade" entrance for the mall. Unfortunately, no upscale stores ever moved into the new addition. Applebee's did move from another section of the mall, but unlike its previous home - which had both exterior and interior entrances - the new location was serviced by an outdoor entrance exclusively. A Buffalo Wild Wings was built on an outlot close to Carson's and Jewel-Osco. Circuit City closed in early 2005, and Old Navy moved to nearby Arlington Heights, all in the midst of the new construction. Bed Bath & Beyond and Steve & Barry's quickly took their places – Bed Bath & Beyond moved into the former Circuit City retail space, while Steve & Barry's opened in the former Applebee's restaurant and Old Navy spaces in 2004 and 2005. The Gruen design had been partially destroyed, and the renovation only temporarily helped stem the tenant outflow.

Redevelopment
In April 2007, the village of Mount Prospect approved a plan that included the demolition of the core of Randhurst. Designs by Larry Beame of Beame Architectural Partnership enabled the existing anchors to remain standing and be integrated into the redeveloped lifestyle center. Beame said the goal was to create "a traditional Main Street shopping experience" that features a primary retail street with diagonal parking and public spaces for socializing. The redevelopment was set to begin within two years.

Randhurst's final shopping day was Tuesday, September 30, 2008. By then, only two stores remained open inside the mall: Fashion Plus, and Your Choice Gifts. Both stores were ordered by management to be vacated by 9:00pm CST.

Demolition began in the winter of 2008/2009 with the mall offices near Carson Pirie Scott so a new loading ramp could be constructed for the department store. The mall was then gutted as it still contained hazardous asbestos insulation. By the following summer, visible demolition work had resumed. Less than eleven months after Randhurst closed, the mall's signature dome was pulled down on August 28, 2009, ending the existence of Cook County's first enclosed mall.

2010s
Construction of Randhurst Village began in the fall of 2009. Bon-Ton Stores, Inc. announced a remodeling of the former mall's Carson Pirie Scott anchor in May 2009, which was completed in November 2010. A new AMC movie theater, with 12 screens, replaced the Randhurst 16 outparcel theater - originally the General Cinema Fourplex (1962–1996) and purchased by AMC in 2002 - in April 2011. T.J.Maxx and Old Navy also opened in Randhurst during 2011 while The Sports Authority replaced Steve & Barry's.

Several signification changes occurred in 2012. A 120-room Hampton Inn & Suites opened alongside several of new retailers and restaurants that included PetSmart, Five Guys and Chipotle. The mall's existing bomb shelter was converted into underground parking for hotel guests.

It was also announced that Experience, Parmida Homes and Torrid would be moving into the lifestyle center by the end of the year. Construction began on new buildings for BlackFinn Ameripub, @The Children’s Place and Panera.

During this time, there were roughly 320,000 people in the area and very little restaurant competition for the lunchtime crowds. In early 2013, Chef Rodelio Aglibot and his partners opened E+O (Earth and Ocean) Food and Drink in Randhurst Village. This spacious restaurant featured an upscale menu and oversized patio to satisfy  the demand from nearby business employees.

After owning Randhurst Village for 22 years, JPMorgan Chase announced plans to sell the 1 million-square-foot lifestyle center in 2014. Several development companies expressed interest in purchasing the property over the next year until it was finally sold to New York-based DLC Management. At the time, it was the largest asset in DLC's portfolio.

Sports Authority closed due to Chapter 11 Bankruptcy in 2016. Michael's took its place in 2017.

On April 18, 2018, the Bon-Ton Stores, Inc. company (owner of Carson's) announced that all of its stores would go into liquidation due to financial reasons. The Carson's store at Randhurst had a little over 56 years of service to the Mount Prospect shopping community; 10 years after the indoor mall's closure, this store closed for good on August 29, 2018. Plans for entertainment or residential venues are likely options for filling in this vacant facility.

2020s
In January 2020, it was announced that the Bed Bath & Beyond store at Randhurst would close along with 40 other stores in the United States and Canada, due to financial issues with their parent company and because the stores no longer met company and consumer expectations.

Bus routes 
Pace

  234 Wheeling/Des Plaines

References

Shopping malls established in 1962
Mount Prospect, Illinois
Shopping malls in Cook County, Illinois
Victor Gruen buildings
1962 establishments in Illinois